Orejón (Oregon), also Coto or Maijiki, is a moribund Tucanoan language of Peru.

Writing system

Nasal vowels have an underlined stroke and tones are indicated using diacritics:
 low-tone vowels with the grave accent ;
 high-tone vowels with the acute accent ;
 low-tone nasal vowels with the macron below and grave accent ;
 high-tone nasal vowels with the macron below and acute accent .

References

Languages of Peru
Tucanoan languages